The Majlis Link is a major highway link in Petaling Jaya city, Selangor, Malaysia. It is built as a bypass to enable motorists from the Federal Highway (Klang direction) to go to Jalan Majlis or vice versa without the need to pass through the congested Freescale Interchange of the Damansara–Puchong Expressway.

List of junctions

Highways in Malaysia